The Black Brant is a family of Canadian-designed sounding rockets originally built by Bristol Aerospace, since absorbed by Magellan Aerospace in Winnipeg, Manitoba. Over 800 Black Brants of various versions have been launched since they were first produced in 1961, and the type remains one of the most popular sounding rockets. They have been repeatedly used by the Canadian Space Agency and NASA.

History
Black Brant was the result of research at Canadian Armament Research and Development Establishment (CARDE) during the 1950s into the nature of the upper part of the atmosphere as part of ongoing research into anti-ballistic missile systems and very-long-range communication. In 1957 CARDE contracted Bristol to produce a simple rocket fuselage, called the Propulsion Test Vehicle, for studies into high-power solid fuels. The resulting design, by Albert Fia, was quite heavy, as it was designed to be able to accommodate a wide variety of engine burning times, propellant loadings and launch angles in keeping with its role as a test vehicle for ABM systems development. The first test flight took place only two years later from the Churchill Rocket Research Range in September 1959.

CARDE's attention later turned to long-distance communications and they found the Propulsion Test Vehicle system useful as a sounding rocket. To better suit this role, Bristol modified the design to be lighter and more tailored to the sounding rocket role. This became the Black Brant. CARDE launched a number of Black Brant rockets over the next few years, both the original Black Brant I design which could place a  payload to  altitude, as well as the larger  which first flew in October 1960, and the smaller but higher-altitude .

The rocket's design emphasized reliability over payload and range. The IV first flew in 1964, but failed, as did the next test launch. Aside from these two launches, which were corrected for, the  has never had another failure, making it one of the most reliable rockets in history. Since then it has undergone continual evolution, and the current versions are the XI and XII, consisting of  used as an upper stage, with Talos and Terrier boosters as lower stages.

The propellant designs developed by CARDE in the  program were the highest performing solid fuels of their day. Bristol then placed this propellant in a new  rocket to form the CRV7, the first rocket capable of penetrating standard Warsaw Pact aircraft hangars. The CRV7 has since gone on to become the de facto standard rocket for most Western-aligned militaries.

In 1976, Australia and Canada through the National Research Council Canada (NRCC) agreed to launch a rocket from Woomera Test Range. The  rocket was launched there on 9 November for experiments in the ionosphere.

At present, due to its 98% success rate, it remains one of the most popular sounding rockets ever built. The rockets have been used repeatedly by the Canadian Space Agency and NASA. There is a 1:1 scale model of the  rocket in front of the head office of the Canadian Space Agency in Saint-Hubert, east of Montréal. A full-scale  is on display in the Science Gallery of The Manitoba Museum in Winnipeg, Manitoba, Canada.

In 1995, a Black Brant XII four-stage sounding rocket from the Andøya Rocket Range off the northwestern coast of Norway caused the Norwegian rocket incident, also known as the Black Brant scare. The trajectory resembled that of a U.S. Navy submarine-launched Trident missile. Russian nuclear forces were put on high alert as a result, fearing a high-altitude nuclear attack that could blind Russian radar, and Russia's "nuclear briefcase", the Cheget, was brought to Russian President Boris Yeltsin, who then had to decide whether to launch a retaliatory nuclear strike against the United States. It is the first and thus far only known incident where any nuclear-weapons state had its nuclear briefcase activated and prepared for launching an attack.

On September 19, 2009, a Black Brant XII that was launched to study clouds caused numerous calls from the northeastern U.S. reporting "strange lights in the sky".

Versions
the following is enumerated by roman numerals

Black Brant I
Black Brant I
Payload: 
Maximum flight height: 
Launch thrust: 
Launch mass: 
Diameter: 
Length:

Black Brant II
Black Brant II, Black Brant IIB
Payload:  (Black Brant II)
Maximum flight height: 
Thrust: 
Mass at launch: 
Diameter: 
Length: 

The II was the first rocket for scientific use and was ready in 1960.

Black Brant III
Black Brant III, Black Brant IIIA, Black Brant IIIB
Payload:  (Black Brant III)
Maximum flight height: 
Thrust: 
Mass at launch: 
Diameter: 
Length:

Black Brant IV
Black Brant IV, a two-stage rocket consisting of Black Brant VA first stage with either a Black Brant IIIA or IIIB second stage, Black Brant IVA, Black Brant IVB
Payload:  (Black Brant IV)
Maximum flight height: 
Thrust: 
Mass at launch: 
Diameter: 
Length:

Black Brant V
Black Brant V, Black Brant VA, Black Brant VB, Black Brant VC
Payload:  (Black Brant V)
Maximum flight height: 
Thrust: 
Mass at launch: 
Diameter: 
Length:

Black Brant VI
Black Brant VI
Maximum flight height: 
Thrust: 
Mass at launch: 
Diameter: 
Length:

Black Brant VII
Black Brant VII
Maximum flight height: 
Thrust: 
Mass at launch: 
Diameter: 
Length:

Black Brant VIII
Black Brant VIII (a.k.a. Nike Black Brant), a two-stage rocket with a Nike M5-E1 booster first stage and either a Black Brant VB or VC second stage, Black Brant VIIIB, Black Brant VIIIC
Maximum flight height:  (Black Brant VIII)
Thrust: 
Mass at launch: 
Diameter: 
Length:

Black Brant IX
Status: Active
Black Brant IX (a.k.a. Terrier Black Brant), a two-stage rocket with a Terrier Mk 70 booster first stage and a Black Brant VB second stage, Black Brant IXB, Black Brant IXBM1, Black Brant IXCM1, Terrier Black Brant XI Mod 2
Gross Mass:  (Black Brant IX)
Height: 
Diameter: 
Apogee: 
First Launch: 1982-03-16
Last Launch: 2022-11-20 17:21 UTC (ACES-2)
Total launches: 314
Successful launches: 309

Black Brant X
Black Brant X (a.k.a. Terrier Black Brant Nihka), a three-stage rocket with a Terrier Mk 70 booster first stage, a Black Brant VB or VC second stage and a Nihka third, Black Brant XB, Black Brant XCM1
Payload:  (Black Brant X)
Maximum flight height: 
Thrust: 
Mass at launch: 
Diameter: 
Length:

Black Brant XI
Black Brant XI (a.k.a. Talos Taurus Black Brant), a three-stage rocket with a Talos booster first stage, Taurus booster second stage, and a Black Brant V third stage, Black Brant XIA
Maximum flight height:  
Thrust:
Mass at launch: 
Diameter: 
Length:

Black Brant XII
Black Brant XII (a.k.a. Talos Terrier Black Brant Nihka), a four-stage rocket with a Mk 11 Mod 5 Talos booster first stage, Terrier booster second stage (pre 2013 Taurus booster motors were used), Black Brant V third stage and Nihka fourth stage, Black Brant XIIA
Maximum flight height: Approximately , dependent on payload
Thrust: 116,001 lbf First Stage Talos Booster
Mass at launch: Approximately , dependent on payload
Diameter:
Length:

See also
 Norwegian rocket incident

References

Further reading
Corliss, William R., NASA Scientific and Technical Information Office (1971), NASA Sounding Rockets, 1958-1968 A Historical Summary, NASA SP-4401. Washington D.C.

External links

Overview on manufacturer's website (click on Black Brant Rocket), archived version with more details
Black Brant entry in Encyclopedia Astronautica
NASA Sounding Rocket User's Handbook

1967 in spaceflight
1971 in spaceflight
1974 in spaceflight
Space program of Canada
Solid-fuel rockets
Sounding rockets of Canada
Suborbital spaceflight